Deividas Česnauskis (born 30 June 1981) is a Lithuanian former professional footballer who played as a winger. He made 63 FIFA-official appearances for the Lithuanian national team scoring four goals.

Club career

Early career
Česnauskis was born in Kuršėnai, Lithuanian SSR. He started his career as a teenage prodigy with Ekranas Panevėžys.

In Russia
Česnauskis earned a move to the Russian Premier League before his nineteenth birthday, when he joined Dynamo Moscow in 2000. In three years playing for Dynamo, he earned 80 caps across all competitions and scored six goals for the club. Česnauskis then joined city rivals Lokomotiv Moscow for the 2004 Russian Premier League. At the end of the season, he won the Russian championship title with Lokomotiv.

Heart of Midlothian
Česnauskis agreed a transfer to Scotland with Heart of Midlothian in 2005. The terms of this deal involved him signing for FBK Kaunas and being immediately loaned to the Edinburgh side for three seasons. He made his Hearts debut against Kilmarnock in the Scottish Cup, scoring the final goal in a 3–1 victory. His second goal for Hearts also came in the Scottish Cup, but it did not prevent his team for losing against Celtic in the semi-final.

In his second season at Hearts he helped the team to win the Scottish Cup by scoring the winning goal in a quarter-final 2–1 win against Partick Thistle. In the same match where Roman Bednar got sent off for diving in the second-half 15 minutes after coming on as a sub. In the final Česnauskis conceded a penalty from which Gretna were able to equalise and make it 1-1. However Hearts went on to win the match on penalties.

Since November 2006, Česnauskis did not play for Hearts over a year due to injuries or simply not being picked, and only played two matches for the Lithuanian national team. He finally made his comeback for Hearts in January 2008 in an away match against Dundee United, and soon after was voted Man of the match in his return to Tynecastle in a 1–1 draw against Kilmarnock. He scored his fourth Hearts goal, and his fourth in the Scottish Cup, against Motherwell on 12 January 2008. He scored his first league goal for Hearts in a 2–1 defeat to Falkirk on 5 May 2008.

On 26 February 2009, Česnauskis said he would leave Hearts in the summer unless he was given first team football before the end of the season, having started just two matches. On 27 April, it was confirmed with immediate effect that Česnauskis and his fellow Lithuanian teammate Saulius Mikoliūnas, left Hearts.

In Greece
On 9 June 2009, Česnauskis signed a two-year contract with Ergotelis F.C. After one season at the club from Heraklion, he signed a three-year contract with another Greek club, Aris Thessaloniki, on 7 June 2010.

FC Baku
In June 2011 Česnauskis signed a two-year contract with Azerbaijan Premier League side FC Baku. In 2012, he won the Azerbaijan Cup with his team. Česnauskis was released by FC Baku at the end of the 2012–13 season after scoring eight goals in 52 appearances for the club. However, on 1 July 2013, Česnauskis signed a new contract with Baku.

FK Trakai
In 2014, he moved back to his home country and joined FK Trakai. With Trakai, he finished runners-up in the 2015 and 2016 A Lyga seasons and reached the final of the Lithuanian Football Cup in 2016, in which his team lost 0–1 against FK Žalgiris after extra time. the At the end of the 2018 season, he retired from professional football.

International career
Česnauskis made eight appearances for the Lithuanian under-21 side. He made his debut for the full national team aged 20, on 4 July 2001 against Estonia.

Until 2016, he earned 56 caps for his country, scoring four goals.

Post-retirement
In November 2018, Lithuanian first division team FK Žalgiris announced Česnauskis as their new sporting director, alongside fellow former Lithuanian national Deividas Šemberas. In January 2020, the club announced that the contract with Česnauskis has been terminated by mutual consent.

Since 2021, he works as a football agent and has his own agency called DC7 Agency.

Personal life
His younger brother, Edgaras, is also a former professional footballer.

Career statistics

Club

International
Scores and results list Lithuania's goal tally first, score column indicates score after each Česnauskis goal.

Honours
Lokomotiv Moscow
Russian Premier League: 2004

Hearts of Midlothian
Scottish Cup: 2005–06

Baku
Azerbaijan Cup: 2011–12

References

External links
 
 
 
 Hearts appearances at londonhearts.com

1981 births
Living people
People from Kuršėnai
Lithuanian footballers
Lithuania international footballers
Lithuanian expatriate footballers
Association football midfielders
A Lyga players
FK Ekranas players
FBK Kaunas footballers
FK Riteriai players
Expatriate footballers in Azerbaijan
Expatriate footballers in Greece
Expatriate footballers in Russia
Expatriate footballers in Scotland
Lithuanian expatriate sportspeople in Azerbaijan
Lithuanian expatriate sportspeople in Greece
Lithuanian expatriate sportspeople in Russia
Lithuanian expatriate sportspeople in Scotland
FC Dynamo Moscow players
FC Lokomotiv Moscow players
Heart of Midlothian F.C. players
Ergotelis F.C. players
Aris Thessaloniki F.C. players
FC Baku players
Russian Premier League players
Scottish Premier League players
Super League Greece players
Azerbaijan Premier League players